Prunișor is a commune located in Mehedinți County, Oltenia, Romania. It is composed of fifteen villages: Arvătești, Balota, Bâltanele, Cervenița, Dragotești, Fântâna Domnească, Ghelmegioaia, Gârnița, Gutu, Igiroasa, Lumnic, Mijarca, Prunaru, Prunișor and Zegaia.

Near Balota, at 44.6003684 N 22.8193706 E, there is a 206 metres tall guyed mast for FM-/TV-broadcasting.

References

Communes in Mehedinți County
Localities in Oltenia